Eberhard Schenk (17 July 1929 – 23 July 2010) was a German Track and field athlete.

Schenk was born in Schneidemühl (Posen-West Prussia) (today Piła, Poland) and became a successful East German athlete of the 1950s. He was twice the East German hurdle race champion 
(1954: 200 meter; 1955: 110 meter).

Schenk started for Einheit Rostock, later SC Empor Rostock. After his career as an athlete he became a practising doctor at Bergen auf Rügen. He died in Bergen auf Rügen, Germany.

He was the father of Christian Schenk.

Personal Best 
 100 Meter: 11,0 sec
 200 Meter: 22,8 sec
 400 Meter: 52,8 sec
 110 Meter hurdles: 14,8 sec
 200 Meter hurdles: 24,7 sec
 400 Meter hurdles: 55,8 sec
 Long jump: 6,24 m
 Triple jump: 13,95 m

References

1929 births
2010 deaths
People from Piła
People from Posen-West Prussia
East German male hurdlers
Sportspeople from Greater Poland Voivodeship